The Department of Kansas was a Union Army command department in the Trans-Mississippi Theater during the American Civil War.  This department existed in three different forms during the war.

1861
The first "Department of Kansas" was created on November 9, 1861 from the Western Department.  It included Kansas, Nebraska Territory, Colorado Territory, Dakota Territory and the Indian Territory (present day Oklahoma).  On March 11, 1862 the department was absorbed into the Department of the Mississippi.  Brigadier General David Hunter was the sole commander during this period.  During this interlude a District of Kansas existed under the command of Brigadier General James W. Denver from March 19-April 10, 1862.

1862
Two months later the Department of Kansas was reformed out of the Dept. of Mississippi on May 2, 1862.  This form of the department included all previous territories except Fort Garland, Colorado.  Brigadier General James G. Blunt was appointed commander.  On August 16, Blunt created the Army of Kansas which was virtually synonymous with the department.  Nebraska and Dakota Territories were detached and transferred to the Department of the Northwest and shortly after on October 11 the Department of Kansas was absorbed into the Department of the Missouri.

The structure of the department during 1962 was as follows;

 Fort Kearny, Captain J A Thompson
 Detachments from; 4th Cavalry Regiment, 6th Cavalry Regiment, and 8th Kansas Volunteer Infantry Regiment
 Fort Riley, Brigadier General R B Mitchell
 2nd Kansas Volunteer Cavalry Regiment
 7th Kansas Volunteer Cavalry Regiment
 1st Kansas Volunteer Infantry Regiment
 12th Wisconsin Volunteer Infantry Regiment
 13th Wisconsin Volunteer Infantry Regiment
 Kansas Volunteer Artillery Battery
 8th Wisconsin Volunteer Artillery Battery
 Fort Laramie, Colonel E B Alexander
 Detachments from; 2nd Cavalry Regiment and 10th Infantry Regiment
 Fort Larned, Colonel J Hayden
 Company from the 2nd Infantry Regiment
 Fort Leavenworth, Major W E Prince
 Detachments from the 1st Infantry Regiment and 8th Kansas Volunteer Infantry Regiment
 Two batteries of artillery
 Leavenworth, Kansas, Colonel R H Graham
 5 Companies from the 8th Kansas Volunteer Infantry Regiment
 Fort Scott, Colonel F Salomon
 2nd Ohio Volunteer Cavalry Regiment
 10th Kansas Volunteer Infantry Regiment
 9th Wisconsin Volunteer Infantry Regiment
 2nd Indiana Artillery Battery
 Fort Wise, Lieutenant J M Warner
 One Company from the 10th Infantry Regiment
 Fort Randall, Captain B Mahana
 3 Companies from the 14th Iowa Volunteer Infantry Regiment
 Ohio City, Kansas, Lieutenant Colonel C S Clark
 7 Companies from the 7th Kansas Volunteer Cavalry Regiment
 Paola, Kansas, Lieutenant Colonel W R Judson
 6th Kansas Volunteer Cavalry Regiment
 Springfield, Kansas, colonel P Clayton
 9 Companies from the 5th Kansas Volunteer Cavalry Regiment

1864
On January 1, 1864 the third formation of the Department of Kansas was created.  It included Kansas, Nebraska Territory, Colorado Territory (except Fort Garland), Indian Territory, and Fort Smith, Arkansas.  Major General Samuel R. Curtis was appointed command.  Fort Smith and the Indian Territory were transferred to the Department of Arkansas in April.  On October 13 Curtis organized the Army of the Border, composed of troops from his department to confront Price's Missouri Raid.  For the first time of the war troops from the Department of Kansas were involved in a major campaign, turning back Price's Confederates at the Battle of Westport.  The Army of the Border was disbanded on November 9.  It was also during this time that Colonel John M. Chivington, commander of the District of Colorado Territory, engaged the Native Americans at the battle of Sand Creek.  Shortly after Department of Kansas was merged into the Dept. of Missouri once again.

See also
Army of the Border

References

Sources
Eicher, John H., & Eicher, David J., Civil War High Commands, Stanford University Press, 2001, .

Kansas
Kansas, Department of
1861 establishments in Kansas